Clifford "Cliff" Byrne (born 26 April 1982) is an Irish former footballer, who was most recently assistant manager at Peterborough United.

Byrne previously played for Sunderland. He took part in a UEFA 'B' coaching course in summer 2005.

Following the departure of Izzy Iriekpen Byrne was given the captaincy of the side. He scored two goals in the last two games of the 2008–09 season; his 89th-minute goal against Tranmere Rovers was enough to help Scunthorpe seal the last playoff place. After missing just under a year of action due to injury, Byrne made his first start of the 2011–12 season on 26 November 2011, away to Notts County. He was released by the club in May 2012.

On 27 July 2012, it was announced that Byrne had signed for Oldham Athletic. Byrne scored his first goal for Oldham against his old club Scunthorpe United in a 2–2 draw on 1 January 2013 He rejoined former club Scunthorpe on loan in September 2013. On 17 January 2014, Cliff had his contract at Oldham Athletic cancelled by mutual agreement.

In February 2014, Byrne signed for Roddy Collins at the Brandywell Stadium to play for Derry City for the 2014 League of Ireland season. He scored his first League goal on his third league appearance.

On 19 February 2015, it was reported he had joined Gainsborough Trinity.

On 30 June 2018, he was appointed assistant manager to Grant McCann at Doncaster Rovers F.C.

On 21 June 2019, he was appointed assistant manager again to Grant McCann, following his appointment as head coach at Hull City. Following the takeover of Hull City by Acun Medya Group, backed by Acun Ilıcalı, on 19 January 2022,  Byrne was sacked a few days later.

Career statistics

References

External links

Republic of Ireland profile at Soccer Scene

1982 births
Association footballers from Dublin (city)
Living people
Association football defenders
Republic of Ireland association footballers
Republic of Ireland expatriate association footballers
Republic of Ireland under-21 international footballers
Republic of Ireland youth international footballers
Expatriate footballers in England
Irish expatriate sportspeople in England
Sunderland A.F.C. players
Scunthorpe United F.C. players
Oldham Athletic A.F.C. players
Derry City F.C. players
Alfreton Town F.C. players
Gainsborough Trinity F.C. players
Bottesford Town F.C. players
English Football League players
League of Ireland players
Hull City A.F.C. non-playing staff
Doncaster Rovers F.C. non-playing staff